The National Tribal Festival is celebrated by the aborigines & tribal of India in the National Capital Region, of India i.e. New Delhi. The festival is celebrated in the mid of month of February every year. It is organised by Ministry of Tribal Affairs, Government of India.

The festival
The festival is used to mark the Adivasi & tribal people in India and their indigenous tribal culture.

“Vanaj”-National Tribal Festival-2015
The first edition of National Tribal Festival was held in New Delhi from 13 to 18 February 2015.

See also
 National Tribal Dance Festival

References

Festivals in India
Ministry of Tribal Affairs